Hermeuptychia maimoune is a species of butterfly in the family Nymphalidae. It was described by Arthur Gardiner Butler in 1870. It is found in Peru.

References

Butterflies described in 1870
Euptychiina
Nymphalidae of South America
Taxa named by Arthur Gardiner Butler